Gerald Malloy (born October 26, 1961) is a Democratic member of the South Carolina Senate, representing the 29th District since 2002. He replaced Edward Eli Saleeby after he died. In November 2020, Malloy announced that he would run for Senate Minority Leader. He lost to Brad Hutto.

References

External links
South Carolina Legislature - Senator Gerald Malloy official SC Senate website
Project Vote Smart - Senator Gerald Malloy (SC) profile
Follow the Money - Gerald Malloy
2006 2004 campaign contributions

African-American state legislators in South Carolina
Democratic Party South Carolina state senators
1961 births
Living people
21st-century American politicians
21st-century African-American politicians
20th-century African-American people